Monteagudo Airport is an airport serving Monteagudo, a town in the Chuquisaca Department of Bolivia.

The airport is in a fold valley of the Cordillera Central range, with mountainous terrain nearby to the east and west. The Monteagudo non-directional beacon (Ident: AGU) is located on the field.

See also

Transport in Bolivia
List of airports in Bolivia

References

External links 
Monteagudo Airport at OpenStreetMap
Monteagudo Airport at OurAirports

Monteagudo Airport at FallingRain

Airports in Chuquisaca Department